Cleodoxus is a genus of beetles in the family Cerambycidae, containing the following species:

 Cleodoxus carinatus (White, 1855)
 Cleodoxus lineaticollis Gounelle, 1910

References

Acanthocinini
Cerambycidae genera